Hans Ryde (born 17 January 1931) is a Swedish physicist who is a member of the Royal Swedish Academy of Sciences. He was awarded his Doctor of Philosophy at Stockholm University in 1962. He was employed by the Research Institute of Atomic Physics in Frecati, Stockholm during the 60s and 70s, where he did his research in the field of nuclear structural physics in general and deformed nuclear nuclei in particular. By using a 225-cm cyclotron he discovered, together with his colleague Arne Johnson, that there was a backbending effect in fast rotating nuclei. In 1975 he replaced Sten von Friesen as a professor at the Department of Physics, Lund University. He became a member of the Royal Swedish Academy of Sciences in 1992 and the Finnish Society of Sciences and Letters in 1988.

References 

1931 births
Living people
Swedish physicists
Members of the Royal Swedish Academy of Sciences